Baishui (Chinese: , lit. "White Water") may refer to:

Places
The Baishui River (Baishuijiang)
Baishui County (Baishuixian), in Weinan, Shaanxi
Baishui Town (disambiguation) (Baishuizhen), for all towns named Baishui
 Baishui, Miluo (白水镇), a town in Miluo City, Hunan province
several Baishui Townships (Baishuixiang)
Baishui Township, Guiyang County, in Guiyang County, Hunan
Baishui Township, Wanzai County, in Wanzai County, Jiangxi
Baishui Township, Luxi County, Yunnan, in Luxi County, Yunnan

People
Baishui (musician)